The 2020 Puerto Rico primaries may refer to:

 2020 United States presidential primaries in Puerto Rico
 2020 Puerto Rico Democratic primary

 Territorial government primaries 
 2020 New Progressive Party of Puerto Rico primaries
 2020 Popular Democratic Party of Puerto Rico primaries

2020 Puerto Rico elections
Primary elections in Puerto Rico